is an autobahn in the federal state of Hesse, Germany.  It begins as a continuation of Mainzer Straße (Bundesstraße 263) in Wiesbaden from its junction with A 66 and connects the center of the Hessian capital city with A 60.

Exit list 

 
 
 

|}

External links 

671
A671